Roascio is a comune (municipality) in the Province of Cuneo in the Italian region Piedmont, located about  southeast of Turin and about  east of Cuneo. It includes the hamlets of San Rocco, Sant'Anna, San Giovanni, and Mondoni.

Roascio borders the following municipalities: Castellino Tanaro, Ceva, Igliano, Paroldo, and Torresina.

References

Cities and towns in Piedmont
Comunità Montana Valli Mongia, Cevetta e Langa Cebana